Fairbury is a city in Livingston County, Illinois, United States. The population was 3,757 at the 2010 census.

Fairbury is located on U.S. Route 24 11 miles east of Chenoa and six miles west of Forrest. It was founded in 1857. The town has a large population of members of the Apostolic Christian faith, who first settled in the area in 1864.

History

Fairbury was laid out on November 10, 1857 by Caleb L. Patton and Octave Chanute. Like most Illinois towns of the 1850s, the original town of Fairbury was centered on a depot ground. It consisted of twenty-six blocks, each divided into fourteen to sixteen lots. There was no central public square, but one was later included in Marsh's addition. The plan used was virtually identical to that at Chatsworth Illinois, including the street names, and the plan very similar to that at Gridley and El Paso on the same railroad.

Octave Chanute was a civil engineer employed by the new Peoria and Oquawka Railroad, which is now the Toledo, Peoria and Western Railroad. Caleb L. Patton was an early settler on the land where the town was built. Chanute, a French native, was later famed for publishing Progress in Flying Machines, which helped pioneer aviation (the Wright brothers even mentioned Chanute as a mentor to them). Chanute built the railroad that made Fairbury possible, but did so against the will of Patton, Fairbury's first citizen.

Caleb Patton owned the land that the original town was built on, and he who advertised lots for sale and attracted other people to live there. Today, the original town's area starts at the corner of Maple Street and First Street and stretches to the corner of Oak Street and Seventh Street. When Patton heard that Chanute wanted to build a railroad in his general direction, he saw it as an opportunity to make use of his otherwise deserted land and struck a deal. If Chanute built his railroad through Fairbury, then Patton would give Chanute half of the town's property.

Patton and Chanute reached an agreement, and Chanute kept up his end of the deal. Patton gave a small chunk of the land to the Baptist Church and set aside an area for the railroad and a depot. However, when Chanute reached Fairbury, he was met by a group of armed citizens. The town had passed an ordinance that no railroad would pass through Fairbury, and they advised Chanute to simply build around the town (preferably where the golf course is currently). They had even received an injunction from Pontiac, Illinois forbidding Chanute from building a railroad through the town. Alma Lewis-James, author of Stuffed Clubs and Antimacassars: Account and Tales of Early Fairbury, best describes what Chanute did next:

In 1859, John Marsh bought  of land to the west of Patton's. He donated a section of his property to the town, and it was named Marsh Park. He named another part of his addition to the town Livingston Square. It was to be used for businesses and markets. He built the Arcade Block in another section, which were a series of brick buildings connected to each other. Inside this block were two saddle and harness stores, a gun and sporting goods store, a poultry house, a drug store, Fairbury Marble Works (they made tomb stones for the cemetery), and a bed spring factory. Many more businesses were located here later on. In 1866, the Livingston Hotel was built. It was renowned for being the only hotel in Illinois with running water.

Marsh did not like the east side of Fairbury and developed his west side vigorously. His addition to the town caused it to split; the east side versus the west side. Each side wanted to have the better houses, the better buildings, the better parks, the better everything. No one really knows how this feud started, but the town was clearly divided. After that devastating fire, many of the people on the east side went to work in Marsh's west side because of all of the work opportunities over there. A new railroad was being considered, and Marsh used his power to see that it passed through only the west side of Fairbury and not through the east.

Patton sold his real estate in Fairbury years prior to this, and Wallace Amsbary was now the most prominent citizen in the east. When the railroad came to the west end of Fairbury, the tracks were laid. Marsh and his friends celebrated that Saturday evening. During the celebration, Amsbary and his friends built the railroad through the east side of Fairbury and then started it southbound towards Strawn. A train passed over the tracks the next day, and they stayed there. Amsbary celebrated his victory by building the Fairbury House, and advertised it as the "Poorest Hotel in Illinois."

After the fire caused by the train, three more subsequent fires succeeded in destroying many parts of the town. All of them were around the railroad, and together they destroyed more than twenty buildings and houses. Additionally, every few nights someone would try to start a fire in a residential area, and sometimes succeeded. Fairbury had somehow managed to become a prime location for pyromaniacs.

Whenever a fire would erupt, the town's fire bell rang. Currently, the bell can be found in front of the fire station on Locust Street. A fire was more of a festival than a tragedy because it seemed like whenever the bell rang, the whole town would show up to watch the fire. Fairbury wasn't necessarily large at the time, so finding the fires was not too difficult. Soon, Fairbury became known as the most flammable town in the Midwest.

The fire era of Fairbury came to an end after the Livingston Hotel burned. Marsh blamed Amsbary for the fire, and Amsbary blamed Marsh. Both of the men filed suits against each other for arson, and then for slander. Marsh was indicted, but was found not guilty. The power that the two men held in the town quickly died down, as did the feud between the east and west sides of Fairbury. The town ceased its civil quarrel, and agreed to work with each other instead of against each other. With that, Fairbury was to become just another small town along the Toledo, Peoria, and Western Railroad.

It was in this very town that a resident and restaurant owner named Ronald McDonald was in a 26-year legal battle with McDonald's over the name of his restaurant.  He ultimately prevailed and continued using his name on his restaurant despite objections by the franchise.

Geography

Demographics

As of the census of 2000, there were 3,968 people, 1,544 households, and 1,053 families residing in the city. The racial makeup of the city was 96.80% White, 0.40% African American, 0.05% Native American, 0.45% Asian, 1.66% from other races, and 0.63% from two or more races. Hispanic or Latino of any race were 2.60% of the population.

There were 1,544 households, out of which 34.3% had children under the age of 18 living with them, 56.5% were married couples living together, 8.4% had a female householder with no husband present, and 31.8% were non-families. 28.2% of all households were made up of individuals, and 15.2% had someone living alone who was 65 years of age or older. The average household size was 2.48 and the average family size was 3.05.

In the city, the population was spread out, with 27.0% under the age of 18, 7.5% from 18 to 24, 25.5% from 25 to 44, 19.0% from 45 to 64, and 21.0% who were 65 years of age or older. The median age was 39 years. For every 100 females, there were 90.2 males. For every 100 females age 18 and over, there were 85.2 males.

The median income for a household in the city was $41,298, and the median income for a family was $51,117. Males had a median income of $33,507 versus $24,188 for females. The per capita income for the city was $19,145. About 3.3% of families and 4.9% of the population were below the poverty line, including 3.5% of those under age 18 and 4.3% of those age 65 or over.

Education
The offices of the Prairie Central Consolidated School District are located in Fairbury, as is the district's only high school, Prairie Central High School.  High school graduates who attend community college do so at Heartland Community College, either in Pontiac or Normal.

Notable people
 DJ Ashba, rock musician, lead guitarist for Sixx:A.M., former lead guitarist for Guns N' Roses
 George S. Brydia, journalist, salesman, and politician, was a reporter for the Fairbury Local Record newspaper.
 Skottie Young, comic book artist
 Francis Everett Townsend, an American physician and political activist was born in Fairbury

References

Sources

 Much of the information about Fairbury found here came from Stuffed Clubs and Antimacassars: Accounts and Tales of Early Fairbury, Illinois (Fairbury, IL: Record Print. Co., 1967) by Alma Lewis James. This book can be checked out from the Dominy Memorial Library in Fairbury, IL. Several parts of the book were also published in the Fairbury Blade on April 3, 1958, and was dubbed The Buckle on the Cornbelt.
 Dale Albee published a number of stories of Fairbury life in The Blade entitled Fairbury Glimpses.
 K.A. Strickland wrote an essay about Fairbury's saloonkeepers for a History 402 class. She provided insight on the daily life of Fairbury's citizens in the 1800s.
 The 60 Years Ago section of The Blade reported on July 26, 2006, that Francis Townsend returned to Fairbury around August 9, 1946.
 John T. Flynn's 1948 book The Roosevelt Myth contains several references to Francis Townsend.
 The 70 Years Ago section of The Blade reported on August 5, 2009, that Francis Townsend returned to Fairbury around August 4, 1939.
 The August 24, 2007 edition of The Pantagraph carried the story about renaming the Fairbury Post Office after Francis Townsend.
 The September 8, 2010 edition of The Blade carried the story of Francis Townsend's death in the 50 years ago section.

External links
 Dominy Memorial Library

 
Cities in Illinois
Cities in Livingston County, Illinois
Populated places established in 1857
1857 establishments in Illinois